Klondike Kate is a 1943 American Western film directed by William Castle and starring Ann Savage and Tom Neal. Set in Alaska during the Klondike Gold Rush of the 1890s, it is loosely based on the story of a real figure known as Klondike Kate. She personally selected Savage, a contract starlet at Columbia Pictures, to play her. It was the first time Savage appeared in a lead role.

The film's sets were designed by the art director Lionel Banks. Although the film was a B Picture, it had a higher budget than many such productions and employed numerous extras.

Plot
A young man in Alaska finds himself accused of murder, and must fight to clear his name.

Cast
 Ann Savage as Kathleen O'Day  
 Tom Neal as Jefferson Braddock  
 Glenda Farrell as Molly  
 Constance Worth as Lita  
 Sheldon Leonard as 'Sometime' Smith  
 Lester Allen as Duster Dan  
 George Cleveland as Judge Horace Crawford

See also
 List of American films of 1943

References

Bibliography
 Jordan, Joe. Showmanship: The Cinema of William Castle. BearManor Media, 2014.
 Morton, Lisa & Adamson, Kent. Savage Detours: The Life and Work of Ann Savage. McFarland, 2009.

External links
 

1943 films
1943 Western (genre) films
American Western (genre) films
Columbia Pictures films
Films directed by William Castle
Films scored by Albert Glasser
Films set in Alaska
Films set in the 1890s
American historical films
1940s historical films
American black-and-white films
1940s English-language films
1940s American films